The third season of NCIS: Los Angeles an American police procedural drama television series, originally aired on CBS from September 20, 2011 to May 15, 2012. The season was produced by Shane Brennan Productions and CBS Television Studios, with Shane Brennan as showrunner and executive producer. A total of 24 episodes were produced. A fictional crossover with Hawaii Five-0 occurred during the season in episode twenty-one.

The season introduces Miguel Ferrer as NCIS Assistant Director Owen Granger.

NCIS: Los Angeles ranked #7 with a total of 16.01 million viewers for the 2011–12 U.S. network television season.

Cast and characters

Main 
 Chris O'Donnell as G. Callen, NCIS Senior Special Agent (SSA) of the Office of Special Projects (O.S.P.) in Los Angeles
 Daniela Ruah as Kensi Blye, NCIS Junior Special Agent
 Eric Christian Olsen as Marty Deeks, L.A.P.D. Detective/Liaison To NCIS
 Barrett Foa as Eric Beale, NCIS Technical Operator
 Renée Felice Smith as Nell Jones, NCIS Junior Field Agent and Intelligence Analyst
 Linda Hunt as Henrietta Lange,  NCIS Supervisory Special Agent and Operations Manager
 LL Cool J as Sam Hanna, NCIS Senior Agent, second in command

Recurring 
 Rocky Carroll as Leon Vance, NCIS Director stationed in Washington D.C.
 Brian Avers as Mike Renko, NCIS Special Agent and former member of the O.S.P. and Callen's team
 Vyto Ruginis as Arkday Kolcheck
 Claire Forlani as Lauren Hunter, NCIS Senior Special Agent
 Peter Cambor as Nate Getz, NCIS Special Agent
 Ella Thomas as Jada Khaled
 Miguel Ferrer as Owen Granger, New NCIS  Assistant Director
 Laura Harring as Julia Feldman

Guests 
 Scott Caan as Danny "Danno" Williams
 Daniel Dae Kim as Chin Ho Kelly

Episodes

Production

Development  
NCIS: Los Angeles was renewed for a third season on May 17, 2011.

Crossover 
The season featured a crossover with Hawaii Five-0. The event took place in the form of a two-part crossover. Chris O'Donnell and LL Cool J appeared as G. Callen and Sam Hanna in the twenty-first episode of the Hawaii Five-0 second season titled "Pa Make Loa" ("Touch of Death") on April 30, 2012. In the second part, Scott Caan and Daniel Dae Kim appeared in the third season episode "Touch of Death" which aired on May 1, 2012.

Broadcast 
Season three of NCIS: Los Angeles premiered on September 20, 2011.

Reception

Ratings

Home video release

References 

General

External links 
 
 

2011 American television seasons
2012 American television seasons
03
Works about Mexican drug cartels